Centenary Airport  is an airport serving the town of Centenary, in Mashonaland Central Province, Zimbabwe.

See also
Transport in Zimbabwe
List of airports in Zimbabwe

References

External links
OurAirports - Centenary
OpenStreetMap - Centenary

Airports in Zimbabwe
Buildings and structures in Mashonaland Central Province